Bickersteth is an English surname. Notable people with the surname include:

Edward Bickersteth (1786–1850), English evangelical clergyman
Edward Bickersteth (1850–1897), missionary, first leader of the Cambridge Mission to Delhi, later Bishop of South Tokyo
Edward Henry Bickersteth (1825–1906), poet, Bishop of Exeter
Henry Bickersteth, 1st Baron Langdale KC PC (1783–1851), English law reformer and Master of the Rolls
Henry Bickersteth Durant (1871–1932), Bishop of Lahore from 1913 until his death
John Bickersteth KCVO (1921–2018), Bishop of Bath and Wells from 1975 to 1987, and Clerk of the Closet from 1979 to 1989
John Eyton Bickersteth Mayor (1825–1910), English classical scholar
Joseph Bickersteth Mayor  (1828–1916), English classical scholar and philosopher
Julian Bickersteth (1885–1962), headmaster of St Peter's College, Adelaide and Felsted School, Essex, then Archdeacon of Maidstone
Robert Bickersteth (bishop) (1816–1884), Anglican priest
Robert Bickersteth (MP) (1847–1916), English administrator and Liberal politician